The 1918 Colorado Agricultural Aggies football team represented Colorado Agricultural College (now known as Colorado State University) in the Rocky Mountain Conference (RMC) during the 1918 college football season.  In their eighth season under head coach Harry W. Hughes, the Aggies compiled a 0–2 record, finished last in the RMC, and were outscored by a total of 30 to 13.

Schedule

References

Colorado Agricultural
Colorado State Rams football seasons
Colorado Agricultural Aggies football